The Løvstakken Tunnel is a road tunnel in the city of Bergen in Vestland county, Norway. The tunnel connects the Fyllingsdalen area with the eastern part of the borough of Laksevåg and the city centre. It was built in 1968 to improve connectivity with the newly developed area. The tunnel had an average daily traffic of 17,015 vehicles in 2007, down from 17,702 vehicles in 2000.

In 2002, a safety study by the German company Deutsche  Technologie found serious shortcomings in the tunnel's safety, and among 30 European tunnels studied, the tunnel was ranked in 27th place. This raised the safety standard to minimum requirements, but the traffic volume is still large for a single tunnel.

References

Road tunnels in Bergen
1968 establishments in Norway
Tunnels completed in 1968